Kowaliga is a name. It may refer to:
 Kowaliga, Alabama
 Kaw-Liga (also spelled Kowaliga), a 1953 country song by Hank Williams